Tina Cane is an American poet and activist in Rhode Island. She is currently the Poet Laureate of Rhode Island; she was appointed in 2016 for a five-year term.

Early life 
Cane was born in Hell's Kitchen, New York City, New York. She earned a bachelor's degree in art at the University of Vermont, studied at the University of Paris X-Nanterre and the Sorbonne University, and earned a master's degree in French literature from Middlebury College.

Career 
After graduating, Cane was active in New York City's Teachers & Writers Collaborative.  Cane moved to Rhode Island in 2005.  She founded Writers in the Schools in 2010, and remains the organization's Executive Director. 

Cane became Poet Laureate in 2016. As Poet Laureate Cane is responsible for coordinating and selecting the youth poet laureate or youth ambassadors for the state of Rhode Island. Cane has a regular column in the Providence Journal. In 2017, Cane launched a statewide Poetry in Motion program where poetry is featured on digital screens in RIPTA buses. Cane also founded the Youth Poetry Ambassadors in 2017.

Cane's work features current topics and is often written free form. Her poems have appeared in The Literary Review, Barrow Street, The Cortland Review and Tupelo Quarterly.

Works 
 Body of Work (Veliz Books, 2019)
 Once More With Feeling, 2017 
 Dear Elena: Letters for Elena Ferrante (Skillman Avenue Press, 2016)
 The Fifth Thought, 2008

Awards and honors 
 Fellowship Merit Award, Rhode Island State Council on the Arts, 2016

References

External links 
 Writers-in-the-Schools founded and directed by Tina Cane
 Poetry Dose, a podcast about poetry hosted by Tina Cane and Atticus Allen

Poets Laureate of Rhode Island
Poets from Rhode Island
Year of birth missing (living people)
Living people
University of Vermont alumni
Middlebury College alumni